Jean-Marc Pelletier (born March 4, 1978) is an American former professional ice hockey goaltender who played seven National Hockey League (NHL) games over parts of three seasons for the Philadelphia Flyers and Phoenix Coyotes between 1999 and 2004. The rest of his career, which lasted from 1998 to 2010, was mainly spent in the minor leagues.

Biography
Pelletier was born in Atlanta, Georgia, and grew up in Saint-Lambert, Quebec. As a youth, he played in the 1992 Quebec International Pee-Wee Hockey Tournament with the Richelieu Champlain minor ice hockey team.

Pelletier was drafted out of Cornell University by the Philadelphia Flyers in the second round of the 1997 NHL Entry Draft with the 30th overall pick. He played the 1997–98 season with the Rimouski Océanic of the Quebec Major Junior Hockey League, and also played for Team USA at the 1998 World Junior Ice Hockey Championships.

Pelletier joined the Flyers' AHL affiliate, the Philadelphia Phantoms in 1998–99. He also appeared in one NHL game that season for the Flyers, a 0-5 loss against the Ottawa Senators. He made brief stops in the NHL in two other seasons, appearing in two games for the Phoenix Coyotes in the 2002–03 season and four more in the 2003–04 season.

At the end of November 2006, Pelletier signed a contract with Adler Mannheim of the DEL to replace Robert Müller, who was diagnosed with a brain tumor. After the season, he signed a one-year-contract with the Hamburg Freezers.

Career statistics

Regular season and playoffs

International

Awards and honors

References

External links
 

1978 births
Living people
Adler Mannheim players
American ice hockey goaltenders
Cincinnati Cyclones (IHL) players
Cornell Big Red men's ice hockey players
Hamburg Freezers players
Ice hockey people from Georgia (U.S. state)
Ice hockey people from Quebec
Lowell Lock Monsters players
People from Saint-Lambert, Quebec
Philadelphia Flyers draft picks
Philadelphia Flyers players
Philadelphia Phantoms players
Phoenix Coyotes players
Rimouski Océanic players
Rochester Americans players
Sportspeople from Atlanta
Springfield Falcons players
Utah Grizzlies (AHL) players